Dunya News is a 24 hours Urdu language news and current affairs television channel from Pakistan. It is governed and operated by the National Communication Services (NCS) Pvt. Ltd. Its head office is situated at Lahore. Dunya News was founded and is owned by the Pakistani businessman and politician Mian Amer Mahmood and is part of the larger Punjab Group of Colleges (PGC) – a group of universities, colleges and organizations. It has numerous, news-centred television shows, like Dunya Kamran Khan Kay Sath and On The Front as well as satirical infotainment shows like Hasb-e-Haal.

The channel has an online stream available on its website. It is one of the most-watched television news channels in Pakistan. The channel ranked 3rd in its news category.

History
Dunya News began transmission in 2008. The channel is known for a center-right news policy orientation. It has also been involved in controversy known as Mediagate.

Dunya News broadcast Pakistan's two most popular satirical news programs, Hasb-e-Haal and Mazaaq Raat. Hasb-e-Haal has been a ratings hit for the channel, with the deft, often bitingly subtle comedy of the actor Sohail Ahmed resonating with a large audience. Mazaaq Raat consists of an ensemble cast and is hosted by Vasay Chaudhry. It is shot in front of a live studio audience.

Since August 2015, it has made the show Dunya Kamran Khan Kay Sath, hosted by the veteran journalist Kamran Khan (currently president and editor-in-chief of Dunya Media Group).

Popular shows 
 Ikhtilafi Note
Cricket Dewangi
Dunya Kamran Khan Kay Sath
Dunya TV Special
Election Caravan
Hasb-e-Haal
Ilm-O-Hikmat
Khabar Yeh Hay
Mahaaz
Mazaaq Raat
Meri Dunya
Nuqta E Nazar
On The Front with Kamran Shahid
Peyam-E-Subh
Think Tank
The Sports Show
Voice of Dunya
Yaad Karti Hay Dunya
Sawal Awam Ka

Former shows 
Mahaaz
Meray Agay
Meri Dharti Meri Dunya
Miss Dunya (2010)
Police File
Policy Matters
Saboot
Speed
Aik Din Dunya Ke Saath
Buttameezain
Crossfire
dUNYA Meray Agay
Dunya Today
Dunya @ 8 with Malick
Deen-o-Danish
In Session with Asma Chaudhary
Dunya Taiz Ter
Hari Mirchain
Jaago Dunya
Kyun
Khari Baat
Top Story
Tonight With Moeed Pirzada
Talash
News Watch

See also
 Daily Dunya
 List of television stations in Pakistan
 List of news channels in Pakistan

References

External links
 
 Dunya newspaper in Urdu

Urdu-language television channels
24-hour television news channels in Pakistan
Television channels and stations established in 2009
Urdu-language television channels in the United Kingdom
Mass media in Pakistan
Television stations in Lahore
Television stations in Pakistan